In the Air may refer to:

Albums
In the Air (The Handsome Family album), 2000
In the Air (Morgan Page album), 2012

Songs
"In the Air" (Chipmunk song), 2011 
"In the Air" (DMA's song), 2018
"In the Air" (L.A.B. song), 2019
"In the Air" (True Tiger song), 2011
"In the Air" (TV Rock song), 2010
"In the Air", a 2010 song by Anika Moa

See also